Troha is a surname from the Slovenian word for "scrap". Notable people with the surname include:

Ivana Troha (born 1980), Croatian volleyball player
Robert Troha (born 1977), Croatian basketball player

References

Slovene-language surnames